Strathdon (Gaelic: Srath Dheathain) is an area in Aberdeenshire, Scotland. It is situated in the strath of the River Don, 45 miles west of Aberdeen in the Highlands. The main village in the strath is also called Strathdon, although it was originally called Invernochty due to its location at the confluence of the River Don and the Water of Nochty. Also included within the area of Strathdon is the settlement of Bellabeg which has many of the local community's main facilities.

Strathdon is an informal geographical area. This means that there are no precise boundaries in terms of where it begins or ends. It is the founding place of the Lonach Highland and Friendly Society, and the Lonach Highland Gathering. This is a traditional Highland Gathering with the heavy sport events such as tossing the caber, hammer etc., and it also hosts a competition of Highland dancing. Dances include the noted 'Highland Fling', 'Sword Dance', 'Seann Triubhas' and 'Reel of Tulloch'.

Notable figures who have visited Strathdon include Sean Connery, Billy Connolly, Ewan McGregor and Queen Elizabeth II. Connolly owned Candacraig House between 1998 and 2013.

See also
Doune of Invernochty

References

External links

 A tale of witches set in Strathdon

Villages in Aberdeenshire